José Enrique Pedreira (February 2, 1904 – January 6, 1959) was a Puerto Rican composer noted for danzas.

Early years
Pedreira was one of four siblings born to José María Pedreira and Rosa Kehrham in San Juan, Puerto Rico.
His family, who was financially prosperous, sent him to the best private schools in the island. He began to take private music lessons at a young age. In 1922, he graduated from high school and was sent to New York City, by his parents, to continue his musical education. He enrolled in the music school of Zygmunt Stojowski and learned piano and music composition. It was there that he met a fellow student who was to become his wife, Alicia Hutchinson. During his student years he composed his first work, the waltz “Alicia”.

Musical career
In 1932, Pedreira returned to Puerto Rico with his wife and established the Pedreira Academy of Music in San Juan. He gave piano lessons while she (a pianist in her own right) gave piano and violin lessons. During his spare time he composed music and danzas for piano, violin and cello. The couple had one child, José Enrique “Quique” Pedreira Hutchinson.

Musical compositions
Besides “Alicia”, his first composition, he composed "Canción Criolla" in 1934, for which he was awarded the Elzaburu priz from the Ateneo Puertorriqueño. He also composed "Concierto en re menor para piano y orquestra" (Concert in R minor for Piano and Orquestra) and in 1942, “Ensueño de Marta” his first danza. In October 1946. Pedreira's composition “Estudio de Concierto en Do Sostenido Menor” was included in Hilda Andino's concert at Carnegie Hall.

Pedreira also received many awards. He won a competition sponsored by the Juilliard School of Music in New York, with his composition "Tus Caricias" and a first prize for his danza "Siempre", during the celebration of Juan Morel Campos 100th birthday in 1957.

Many of his compositions were used by other Puerto Rican artists, among them Jesús Maria Sanromá and Graciela Rivera. His compositions were not all piano related. He also composed various works to be played on the violin.

In 1953, Pedreira and José Raúl Ramírez created the Dúo Piano-Organo “Pedreira-Ramírez”. The duo performed in various weekly radio and television programs. They also performed in various cities in the United States.

Legacy
José Enrique Pedreira died on January 6, 1959, in San Juan, Puerto Rico. José Raúl Ramírez was petitioned by his widow, Alicia Hutchinson, to become custodian of his works. During the years, Ramírez published many of the works by Pedreira. In 1985, Pedreira was posthumously inducted into the Danza Composers Hall of Fame located in the town of San German, Puerto Rico.

Selected compositions
 Canción de cuna para un infante moribundo (Lullaby for a Dying Child) for cello (or viola) and piano (1954)
 Caricias (Your Tender Touch)
 Colibrí
 Concerto in D minor for piano and orchestra
 Elegía India, Poema y Souvenir
 El Jardín de piedra (Garden of Rock), Ballet; libretto by Lotti Tischer
 Encanto
 Ensueño de Marta (Martha's Dream), Danza for piano (1956)
 Nocturne melancholique for piano (1950)
 No podrás olvidarme, Canción Bolero for voice and piano (1947)
 Plenitude, Nocturne for piano (1948)
 Ritmo, Zapateado for piano (1956)
 Siempre (Always), Danza for piano (1960); dedicated to Juan Morel Campos
 Sonata in B minor for piano
 Súplica, Danza for piano (1949)
 Tus caricias, Danza for piano (1948)
 Vals en la major (Waltz in A major) for piano (1949)
 Valses de Concierto (Concert Waltzes)

Awards and recognitions
Pedreira received many awards and recognitions during his lifetime.  Some of the institutions that honored him were:
 The University of Puerto Rico
 The Puerto Rican Athenaeum
 The Juilliard School of Music
 The Women's Civic Club of San Juan

See also

 List of Puerto Ricans

References

External links
 Siempre by José Enrique Pedreira

1904 births
1959 deaths
Puerto Rican composers
Puerto Rican male composers
Puerto Rican musicians
People from San Juan, Puerto Rico
20th-century American composers
20th-century American male musicians